Tsoureki also known as Šurēk (Arabic), choreg or "chorek" (Armenian չորեկ, կաթնահունց), çörək (Azerbaijani), çyrek (Albanian), kozunak (Bulgarian козунак), cozonac (Romanian) or paskalya çöreği (Turkish) is a sweet holiday bread made with flour, milk, butter, eggs, and sugar and commonly seasoned with orange zest, mastic resin, or mahlab.  Lampropsomo, a variation of tsoureki commonly called "Greek Easter bread," is made by Greek communities during Easter, not only in Greece, but also in other countries with Greek communities. It is also sometimes called Armenian Easter bread.

Etymology

The Greek word tsoureki is borrowed from Turkish çörek. Some dictionaries claim that this is derived from the Old Turkish root çevir- 'turn';
 others say it is Persian or Armenian.

Greek tradition
There are different variations of the Greek tsoureki holiday breads including a round Christmas loaf with a cross decoration called Christopsomo, a braided easter bread with whole dyed eggs pressed into the dough called lampropsomo, and a loaf with a coin hidden inside for good luck called vasilopita that is baked for St. Basil's Day (New Year's Day).

Easter bread

Tsoureki is a Greek holiday bread that is made by Greeks during Easter, not only in Greece, but also in other countries with Greek communities. It is made from a sweet yeast dough of flour, sugar, eggs, butter and milk, with dyed red Easter eggs pressed into the dough. The dough is brushed with egg wash before baking, and sometimes flavored with mahlep, mastic resin or orange zest. Other flavorings might include almond extract, cinnamon, sultanas or fennel seed.

This bread is sometimes called "Armenian Easter bread". - Զատիկի չորեկ - Zadigi choreg - "Զատիկ Zadig Easter". The ancient Armenian name was "bsatir - պսադիր" ("bsag պսակ" - "crown" and "tir դիր", is the root of "tnel դնել" verb: "to put").This Armenian name is in allusion to Christ’s crown of thorns.  The bsatir or choreg is a type of bread the braided structure of which recalls the woven crown of thorns, the sesame seeds with which it is sprinkled symbolising the thorns themselves. Before baking the choreg, the surface is painted with egg yolk, when exposed to the heat of the oven, it browns until it acquires a reddish-brown tone that represents the blood of Christ. Traditional Armenian choreg omits the dyed Easter eggs.

The Turkish language name for this bread is paskalya çöreği (paskalya is the Turkish word for Easter). The Turkish variant features egg incorporated into the dough, rather than unbroken eggs pressed into the dough by way of decoration. Some recipes substitute a neutral-flavored oil, such as sunflower oil, and margarine in place of milk and butter. The dough may be seasoned with orange zest, vanilla, mahlep and slivered almonds.

Sometime tsoureki is used as a gift for special occasion, for instance, it can be given as an Easter gift from children to their godparents.

Christmas bread
Christopsomo (Χριστόψωμο), which translates as "Christ's bread", is a traditional Greek holiday bread that is sometimes decorated with whole walnuts, sesame seeds and slivered almonds. Also called Christmas fruit bread, the tsoureki dough may include a combination of  raisins, dried apricots, dried figs, orange zest, cinnamon, allspice, cloves, cardamom, Mastic (plant resin)  and mahleb. (Some recipes suggest marinating the raisins and dried figs overnight in wines like retsina or mavrodaphne). Some of the dough is set aside for the loaf's cross-shaped decoration.

The bread may be glazed with a syrup made from honey, orange juice and slivered almonds.

See also

 Cozonac, the Romanian and Bulgarian variant
 Challah
 Cardamom bread
 Pulla
 Zopf
 Vánočka
 Nut roll
 Brioche
 Kulich

References

Sweet breads
Easter bread
Greek breads
Cypriot cuisine
Turkish Cypriot cuisine
Western Armenian cuisine
Azerbaijani cuisine
Turkish breads
Armenian breads
Christmas food